God Rot Tunbridge Wells! is a 1985 British musical television film directed by Tony Palmer, written by John Osborne and starring Trevor Howard, Christopher Bramwell and Dave Griffiths. It was aired on Channel 4 in 1985 and was made to mark the 300th anniversary of Handel's birth.

Plot
In old age, the German composer George Frideric Handel reflects over his life and musical career.

Main cast
 Trevor Howard – Elderly Handel
 Christopher Bramwell – Young Handel
 Dave Griffiths – Handel in middle age
 Isabella Connell – Princess of Wales
 Anne Downie – Vittoria Turquini
 Beth Robens – Handel's Mother
 Simon Donald – Prince Ruspoli

References

External links

1985 television films
1985 films
British biographical films
British musical films
British television films
Channel 4 original programming
Films about classical music and musicians
Films about composers
Films directed by Tony Palmer
Films set in the 18th century
George Frideric Handel in fiction
Cultural depictions of George Frideric Handel
1980s English-language films
1980s British films